Hasan Sevinç (born 1933) is a Turkish wrestler. He competed in the men's freestyle 57 kg at the 1968 Summer Olympics.

References

External links
 

1933 births
Living people
Turkish male sport wrestlers
Olympic wrestlers of Turkey
Wrestlers at the 1968 Summer Olympics
People from Zile
World Wrestling Championships medalists
20th-century Turkish people